Sean Hillary Locklear (born May 29, 1981) is a former American football offensive tackle. He was drafted by the Seattle Seahawks in the third round of the 2004 NFL Draft. He played college football at North Carolina State University. Locklear also played for the Washington Redskins, New York Giants, and Atlanta Falcons.

Professional career

Seattle Seahawks
He was selected with the 21st pick of the third round of the 2004 NFL Draft out of North Carolina State University. Before the start of the 2005 season, he was moved to tackle when starter Floyd Womack was injured in the preseason.

On February 21, 2008, the Seahawks re-signed Locklear, keeping him away from the free agent market. Both sides agreed to a new 5-year extension worth a maximum value of $32 million and $12 million in bonuses.

Washington Redskins
On August 5, 2011, Locklear signed with the Washington Redskins.

New York Giants
On April 11, 2012, Locklear signed with the New York Giants.

Atlanta Falcons
On November 13, 2013, Locklear signed with the Atlanta Falcons on a one-year deal.

References

External links
Seattle Seahawks bio

1981 births
Living people
African-American players of American football
American football offensive guards
American football offensive tackles
Atlanta Falcons players
NC State Wolfpack football players
Seattle Seahawks players
Washington Redskins players
New York Giants players